German submarine U-586 was a Type VIIC U-boat built for Nazi Germany's Kriegsmarine for service during World War II.
She was laid down on 1 October 1940 by Blohm & Voss in Hamburg as yard number 562, launched on 10 July 1941 and commissioned on 4 September 1941 under Kapitänleutnant Dietrich von der Esch.

Design
German Type VIIC submarines were preceded by the shorter Type VIIB submarines. U-586 had a displacement of  when at the surface and  while submerged. She had two shafts and two  propellers.

U-586 was fitted with five  torpedo tubes (four fitted at the bow and one at the stern), fourteen torpedoes, one  SK C/35 naval gun, 220 rounds, and a  C/30 anti-aircraft gun. The boat had a complement of between forty-four and sixty.

Service history
The boat's service began on 4 September 1941 with training as part of the 6th U-boat Flotilla. She was transferred to the 11th U-boat Flotilla on 1 July 1942 and then to the 13th U-boat Flotilla on 1 June 1943. She returned to the 6th U-boat Flotilla a short while later on 1 October 1943, and then to her final assignment with 29th U-boat Flotilla in the Mediterranean.

Wolfpacks
She took part in ten wolfpacks, namely:
Robbe (15 – 24 January 1942)
Greif (14 – 29 May 1942)
Nebelkönig (27 July – 14 August 1942)
Boreas (19 – 26 November 1942)
Taifun (2 – 4 April 1943)
Jahn (31 October – 2 November 1943)
Tirpitz 3 (2 – 8 November 1943)
Eisenhart 5 (9 – 15 November 1943)
Schill 2 (17 – 22 November 1943)
Weddigen (22 – 25 November 1943)

Fate
She was sunk whilst alongside at Missiessy East Quay, Toulon, France, by a USAAF air raid by B-24 Liberator bombers of 15th Air Force on 5 July 1944.

Summary of raiding history

See also
 Mediterranean U-boat Campaign (World War II)

References

Bibliography

External links

German Type VIIC submarines
1941 ships
U-boats commissioned in 1941
U-boats sunk in 1944
U-boats sunk by US aircraft
World War II submarines of Germany
World War II shipwrecks in the Mediterranean Sea
Ships built in Hamburg
Maritime incidents in July 1944